The 2021 Antalya Challenger II was a professional tennis tournament played on clay courts. It was the second edition of the tournament which was part of the 2021 ATP Challenger Tour. It took place in Antalya, Turkey between 1 and 7 February 2021.

Singles main-draw entrants

Seeds

1 Rankings as of 25 January 2021.

Other entrants
The following players received wildcards into the singles main draw:
  Sarp Ağabigün
  Marsel İlhan
  Ergi Kırkın

The following players received entry into the singles main draw as special exempts:
  Cem İlkel
  Tommy Robredo

The following player received entry into the singles main draw as an alternate:
  Ernesto Escobedo

The following players received entry from the qualifying draw:
  Duje Ajduković
  Tomás Martín Etcheverry
  Facundo Mena
  Akira Santillan

The following player received entry as a lucky loser:
  Gian Marco Moroni

Champions

Singles

 Carlos Taberner def.  Jaume Munar 6–4, 6–1.

Doubles

 Denys Molchanov /  Aleksandr Nedovyesov def.  Robert Galloway /  Alex Lawson 6–4, 7–6(7–2).

References

2021 ATP Challenger Tour
2021 in Turkish tennis
February 2021 sports events in Turkey